The Trans Bhutan Trail is a  east–west trail in Bhutan, stretching from Haa to Trashigang and crossing 27 gewogs and nine dzongkhags.

Origins 
Dating back to the 16th century, the trails, used by rulers, monks, pilgrims, traders and message carriers known as garps, were the only way to travel across Bhutan. The trail fell into disuse and disrepair after the construction of Bhutan's first national highway in 1962; much of is it subsumed by the new roads.

Restoration 
The project to restore the trail began in 2018, led by the Bhutan Canada Foundation, the government of Bhutan and the Trans-Bhutan Trail, a non-profit organisation formed for the project. It involved restoring or rebuilding 18 major bridges, more than 10,000 steps, and placing QR codes that can be used to access the local area's history; about 900 workers furloughed during the COVID-19 pandemic helped with the project. The trail opened to tourists on 28 September 2022.

References

Further reading

External links 

Transport in Bhutan
Hiking trails in Asia